Pura McGregor  (née Te Pura Manihera, 1855 – 4 March 1920), also known as Pura Makarika, was a community leader in Whanganui, New Zealand, and the first Māori woman to receive an MBE. She was of Ngā Poutama, Ngāti Ruāka and Ngāti Rangi descent.

Biography 
McGregor was born in 1855 at Karatia on the Whanganui River. Her father was Maui Te Manihera of Ngā Poutama and her mother Hohi Hori Kingi of Ngāti Ruāka and Ngāti Rangi. Her father was killed in the New Zealand Wars at the Battle of Moutoa in 1864. After her father's death her mother married Stewart Manson, who owned stores in Whanganui and surrounding settlements. Her uncle was Te Keepa Te Rangihiwinui (Major Kemp) and McGregor accompanied him on his campaigns against Te Kooti during the New Zealand Wars, leading the haka before Te Kepa went into battle. 

In 1879 she married Gregor McGregor. McGregor was the son of Scottish settlers; his father was from Uist in the Outer Hebrides. His mother disapproved of her son's marriage to a Māori woman. After the marriage Gregor ran one of Stewart Manson's stores at Ranana on the Whanganui River, became a canoe-man on the river, was fluent in Māori and became the first station manager of Morikau station at Ranana. They had three children: two sons, Gregor and George Stewart, and a daughter, Rawinia who died in her teenage years. George married Maata Mahupuku, a muse of Katherine Mansfield. 

McGregor resided for most of her married life at 129 Harrison Street in Whanganui, and became a notable community leader. She was president of the Putiki Maori Ladies' Branch of the Lady Liverpool League. She was active in the Wanganui Beautifying Society and enlisted the help of both Pākehā and Māori locals to plant native shrubs and trees around Rotokawau Virginia Lake in Whanganui as well as raising funds.

Honour 
McGregor's work supporting the Māori Expeditionary Force was recognised in the 1919 King's Birthday Honours. Her honour is recorded as an MBE in the 1919 Yearbook and other sources of the time. Other sources record it as an OBE. She was the first Māori woman to receive the honour.

Death and legacy 

McGregor died in Whanganui on 4 March 1920, and was buried at the Wanganui Old Cemetery, now the Heads Road Cemetery.

In 1921, a waka maumahara (memorial canoe) to McGregor was erected at Toronui Point on Rotokawau Virginia Lake; it consisted of a half tōtara river canoe set with the bow pointing towards the sky. It was decorated with a kowhaiwhai pattern traditional to her marae. The plaque at the base bore the inscription: The canoe was removed in about 1987 after it had rotted. It was replaced with a new waka maumahara built of Corten steel for durability and decorated with a design by artist Cecelia Kumeroa; it was unveiled in 2020.

McGregor left her treasured possessions (taonga) to the Whanganui Regional Museum. Artist Alexis Neal, stimulated by seeing McGregor's artefacts, created a woven woollen cloak in her memory.

References

External links 
 Photo of Pura McGregor, Gregor McGregor and their son Denton, 1910 in Alexander Turnbull Library
 Photo of canoe tiki memorial to Te Pura Manihera (Mrs Gregor McGregor) near Virginia Lake, Wanganui, 1941 in Te Papa Tongarewa
 

1855 births
1920 deaths
New Zealand Members of the Order of the British Empire
19th-century New Zealand people
20th-century New Zealand women
19th-century New Zealand women
New Zealand Māori women
Ngāti Rangi people
People from Manawatū-Whanganui